Orlické Záhoří is a municipality and village in the Rychnov nad Kněžnou District in the Hradec Králové Region of the Czech Republic. It has about 200 inhabitants.

Administrative parts
Orlické Záhoří is made up of one administrative part.

Etymology

The name may be approximately translated as "Orlické Transmountain Area".

Geography
It lies in the Orlické Mountains. The municipality consists of several settlements scattered in the Divoká Orlice valley. It lies along the border with Poland, which matches the flow of the Divoká Orlice river in this area.

History
The settlement of the area is connected with the work of glassmakers and lumberjacks in the Orlické Mountains from 1590–1600. Orlické Záhoří was established in 1951 by merger of settlements Bedřichovka, Černá Voda, Jadrná, Kunštát, Trčkov and Zelenka.

Transport

The municipality has the road and pedestrian border crossing Orlické Záhoří / Mostowice and the pedestrian border crossing Bedřichovka / Lasówka to Poland.

Sights
The landmark of Orlické Záhoří is the Church of Saint John the Baptist. It is a late Baroque building from 1754–1763, which replaced an old wooden church.

Twin towns – sister cities

Orlické Záhoří is twinned with:
 Bystrzyca Kłodzka, Poland

References

External links

Villages in Rychnov nad Kněžnou District